Karen Miller is an Australian writer. She is best known for The Innocent Mage, the first book in her duology Kingmaker, Kingbreaker.

Biography
Miller was born in Vancouver, British Columbia, Canada and moved to Australia at the age of two. After graduating from the University of Technology, Sydney she moved to England for three years before moving back to Australia. Along with being a novelist she has written and directed plays for her local theatre group.

In 2005 Miller's first novel was released entitled The Innocent Mage. This was the first novel in the Kingmaker, Kingbreaker series and was followed shortly after by Innocence Lost. The Innocent Mage was widely acclaimed on its release in Australia and was a finalist in the 2005 Aurealis Awards fantasy division. Since then she has written several other novels, including two for Fandemonium's Stargate SG-1 series. In 2007, she was shortlisted for the James Tiptree, Jr. Award for her novels Empress of Mijak and The Riven Kingdom.

Miller also writes under the pseudonym K. E. Mills, releasing the first novel in the Rogue Agent series, The Accidental Sorcerer, under this pen name.

Bibliography

Kingmaker, Kingbreaker Universe
Kingmaker, Kingbreaker (title of omnibus edition)
 The Innocent Mage (2005)
 Innocence Lost (The Awakened Mage in US/Canada/UK) (2005)
Fisherman's Children
 The Prodigal Mage (2009)
 The Reluctant Mage (2010)
Prequel
 A Blight of Mages (2012)

Godspeaker
 Empress of Mijak (Empress in US/Canada/UK) (2007)
 The Riven Kingdom (2007)
 Hammer of God (2008)

Rogue Agent
 The Accidental Sorcerer (2008) writing as K. E. Mills. 
 Witches Incorporated    (2009) writing as K. E. Mills. 
 Wizard Squared              (June 2010) writing as K. E. Mills. 
 Wizard Undercover           (May 2012) writing as K. E. Mills.

The Tarnished Crown
 The Falcon Throne (2014)
 The Prince of Glass (not yet published)

Star Wars
 The Clone Wars: Wild Space (2008)
 Clone Wars Gambit: Stealth (2010)
 Clone Wars Gambit: Siege (2010)
 "Roll of the Dice" (2012), in Star Wars Insider

Stargate SG-1
 Alliances (2006)
 Medical Considerations (2006) in the Stargate Magazine
 Do No Harm (2008)

Awards and nominations

Aurealis Awards
Fantasy division
Finalist: The Innocent Mage (2005)
Honoured: Empress of Mijak (2007)
Finalist: The Riven Kingdom (2008)
Finalist: Witches Incorporated (2009)

James Tiptree, Jr. Award
Honoured: Empress of Mijak (2007)
Honoured: The Riven Kingdom (2007)

References

External links

 
 Profile at HarperCollinsPublishers Australia

21st-century Australian novelists
Australian fantasy writers
Australian women novelists
Canadian emigrants to Australia
Living people
21st-century Australian women writers
Women science fiction and fantasy writers
Writers from Vancouver
Year of birth missing (living people)